Crossoloricaria is a genus of armored catfish native to South America with one species ranging into Central America.

Taxonomy
Crossloricaria is classified in the Pseudohemiodon group in the tribe Loricariini of the subfamily Loricariinae. This genus is poorly diagnosed and is in need of revision. Its only diagnostic character (incomplete abdominal cover consisting of a double median row of plates) is shared by two other representatives of the Pseudohemiodon group, Apistoloricaria and Rhadinoloricaria. On top of this, C. rhami has a complete abdominal cover of plates, rendering this diagnostic feature invalid. Crossoloricaria also has some traits such as lip structure and barbel length that places it closer to Pseudohemiodon.

Species
There are currently five recognized species in this genus:
 Crossoloricaria bahuaja F. Chang & E. Castro, 1999
 Crossoloricaria cephalaspis Isbrücker, 1979
 Crossoloricaria rhami Isbrücker & Nijssen, 1983
 Crossoloricaria variegata (Steindachner, 1879)
 Crossoloricaria venezuelae (L. P. Schultz, 1944)

Distribution and habitat
The species of Crossoloricaria are distributed in the northwestern part of South America along the Pacific slope (in Panama and Colombia), Lake Maracaibo region (Venezuela), and the upper Amazon system (Peru). Crossoloricaria species occur over sandy substrates of larger rivers and their tributaries.

References

Loricariini
Fish of South America
Fish of the Amazon basin
Freshwater fish genera
Catfish genera
Taxa named by Isaäc J. H. Isbrücker